The Orchard is the second studio album of the American indie rock band Ra Ra Riot.
On October 26, 2010 the song "Boy" was made available for 69 cents in iTunes Store and garnered some interest reaching a peak of no. 152 on the iTunes popularity chart while also charting at No. 34 on the Billboard Rock Digital chart.

Track listing

Japanese Track listing

Videos
 "Boy": Directed by Adam Levite
 "Too Dramatic": Directed by Andrew Thomas Huang

Personnel

Ra Ra Riot
 Milo Bonacci - Guitar, Keyboards
 Alexandra Lawn - Cello, Vocals
 Wes Miles - Vocals, Keyboards
 Mathieu Santos - Bass
 Rebecca Zeller - Violin
 Gabe Duquette - Drums

Additional personnel
 Andrew Maury - Co-producer, Engineer
 Chris Walla - Mixer (Tracks 1-7, 9-10)
 Rostam Batmanglij - Mixer (Track 8)
 Greg Calbi - Mastering Engineer

References

External links
Official website
MySpace website
Barsuk Records

Ra Ra Riot albums
2010 albums